The 1983–84 Houston Cougars men's basketball team represented the University of Houston during the 1983–84 NCAA Division I men's basketball season. The head coach was Guy Lewis. The team played its home games in the Hofheinz Pavilion in Houston, Texas, and was then a member of the Southwest Conference.

The third of Houston's famous Phi Slama Jama teams, this squad was led by Michael Young, Alvin Franklin, and future Hall of Famer Akeem Olajuwon. The Cougars played in the Final Four for the third consecutive season, appeared in their second straight National Championship Game, and completed a three-year run with an overall record of 88-16.

Roster

Schedule and results

|-
!colspan=12 style=| Regular season

|-
!colspan=12 style=| SWC Tournament

|-
!colspan=12 style=| NCAA Tournament

Rankings

Awards and honors
Akeem Olajuwon – Consensus First-team All-American, SWC Player of the Year
Michael Young – Third-team All-American

Team players drafted into the NBA

References

External links
Jamfest for the Ages—2007 ESPN.com article commemorating Phi Slama Jama

Houston Cougars men's basketball seasons
NCAA Division I men's basketball tournament Final Four seasons
Houston
Houston
Houston
Houston